Sophora wightii is a species of flowering plant in the family Fabaceae, that is endemic to Tamil Nadu, India.

References

wightii
Flora of Tamil Nadu
Endangered plants
Taxonomy articles created by Polbot